See Mansura (disambiguation) for other sites with similar names.

Mansurat al-Khayt was a Palestinian Arab village in the Safad Subdistrict. It was depopulated during the 1947–48 Civil War in Mandatory Palestine on January 18, 1948. It was located 11.5 km east of Safed, 1 km west of the Jordan River.

History
Part of the name, al-Khayt, came from the area named as ard al-khayt, located southwest of the lake of Hula.

Al-Dimashqi  (d.1327) wrote about Al Khait: "A district of the Upper Ghaur of the  Jordan Valley. The country resembles that of Irak  in the matter of its rice, its birds, its hot springs, and excellent crops."

In the mid 18th century, The Syrian Sufi teacher and traveller al-Bakri al-Siddiqi (1688-1748/9) noted that he passed by al-Khayt with a  judge from  Safad.

British Mandate era
In the 1922 census of Palestine, conducted by the British Mandate authorities, Kerad al Khait had  a population of 437 Muslims,  increasing in the 1931 census when Mansurat el Hula had to 367 Muslims inhabitants,  in  a total of 61  houses.

In the 1945 statistics the village had a population of 200 Muslims, with 6,735 dunams of land, all of which was publicly owned. Of this, 5,052 dunams were used for cereals, while  17 dunams were classified as built-up, public areas.

The village was also known by Mansurat al-Hula to distinguish it from al-Mansura in Safed and had a shrine for a local sage known as al-Shaykh Mansur from which the village was named after.

1948, aftermath
The village was temporarily evacuated after a Haganah attack on 18 January 1948. The Haganah was under order to "eliminate" anyone in the village who resisted.  It was noted that  "houses and shacks were set alight" during the attack.

In July 1948,  a new  settlement called Habonim, later renamed Kfar Hanassi, went up on the land of Mansurat al-Khayt.

References

Bibliography

External links
Welcome To Mansurat al-Khayt
 Mansurat al-Khayt,  Zochrot
Mansurat al-Khayt, Villages of Palestine
Survey of Western Palestine, map 4:  IAA, Wikimedia commons

Arab villages depopulated during the 1948 Arab–Israeli War
District of Safad